Babar Saleem Swati is a Pakistani politician who had been a member of the Provincial Assembly of Khyber Pakhtunkhwa from August 2018 till January 2023. He was also the Advisor to the Chief Minister on Home and Tribal Affairs from October 2022 till January 2023.

Political career

He was elected to the Provincial Assembly of Khyber Pakhtunkhwa as a candidate of Pakistan Tehreek-e-Insaf from Constituency PK-31 (Mansehra-II) in 2018 Pakistani general election.

References

Living people
Pakistan Tehreek-e-Insaf MPAs (Khyber Pakhtunkhwa)
Swati
Year of birth missing (living people)
People from Swat District